The West Point First Nation is a Dene First Nations band government in the Northwest Territories, Canada. The band is headquartered in the town of Hay River, where its main community is located.

The West Point First Nation is a member of the Dehcho First Nations.

References

First Nations in the Northwest Territories
Dene governments